Jari aka "Yari" Kirkland (born 1976) is an American ski mountaineer and marathon mountain biker. She has been member of the national ski mountaineering selection since 2010.

Selected results 
 2010:
 9th, World Championship relay race, together with Molly Zurm and Amy Fulywer
 10th, World Championship team race, together with Nina Cook Silitch
 2011:
 7th, World Championship relay, together with Nina Cook Silitch and Janelle Smiley
 1st, Power of Four, Aspen Mountain, women's team, together with Eva Hagen
 2012:
 5th, North American Championship, individual
 5th, North American Championship, total ranking
 7th, North American Championship, sprint
 2013:
 1st, 12 Hours of the Hill of Truth

External links 
 "Yari" Kirkland at skimountaineers.org

References 

1976 births
Living people
American female ski mountaineers
Marathon mountain bikers
American mountain bikers
American female cyclists
21st-century American women